Aarau Torfeld railway station is a railway station in the municipality of Aarau, in the Swiss canton of Aargau. It is an intermediate stop on the  gauge Schöftland–Aarau–Menziken line of Aargau Verkehr. The station opened on 10 December 2017.

Services
The following services stop at Aarau Torfeld:

References

External links 
 

Railway stations in Switzerland opened in 2017
Railway stations in the canton of Aargau
Aargau Verkehr stations